The Bauerngraben, also called the Hungersee, is a lake in Germany between Breitungen,  and Roßla in the South Harz. A feature of this lake is its sudden disappearance from time to time, when the outlet opens due to the removal of material. The lake can then become dry for a long period. The Bauerngraben ist part of the Gipskarstlandschaft Questenberg nature reserve.

The Karst Trail runs through the area. The Bauerngraben is a popular destination for day trippers and is easy to reach due to the nearby car park and easy footpaths. There is a checkpoint (no. 213) in the Harzer Wandernadel hiking system by the lake.

External links 

 The Bauerngraben at karstwanderweg.de
 The Bauerngraben, karstwanderweg.de
 Private website on the Bauerngraben
 Comprehensive report in Petermann's Geographische Mitteilungen, 1864
 Universal-lexikon Vol. 3, published by Heinrich August Pierer (extract from google books)

Lakes of Saxony-Anhalt
Harz
Mansfeld-Südharz
Karst formations of Germany